Odorrana wuchuanensis, also known as the Wuchuan odorous frog or Wuchuan frog, is a species of frog in the family Ranidae. It is endemic to southern–central China: Guizhou, Guanxi, and Hubei provinces. For a long time, it was only known from a single limestone cave in Baicun, Wuchuan. Adults live in limestone caves in karst areas, often on cliffs inside caves, near ponds. Tadpoles can be found also outside cases.

References

wuchuanensis
Frogs of China
Endemic fauna of China
Amphibians described in 1983
Taxonomy articles created by Polbot